Gotham Underground is a nine-issue limited series from DC Comics, written by Frank Tieri, with art by Jim Califiore.

The series looked at the repercussions of Countdown to Final Crisis and focuses on the Batman Family banding together to prevent a gang war to find out who will occupy the territory that belonged to the recently deceased Black Mask.

Publication history
The series ran from December 2007 to August 2008.

Some of the issues tie in with Salvation Run.

A trade paperback was released on November 19, 2008.

Plot
A group of people hidden in the shadows targets Man-Bat with their hi-tech gadgetry and take him captive. Talking amongst themselves, they discuss what their next target will be. At Gotham City's police headquarters, Commissioner Gordon lights the Bat-Signal, but only Robin answers the call. Gordon tells him about the recent upsurge in gang-related violence. Dozens of would-be crime lords are trying to fill the vacancy created by the death of Black Mask. Meanwhile, Batman infiltrates the Iceberg Lounge in the guise of henchman Matches Malone. He wants to keep an eye on the Penguin's recent activities. He knows that the Penguin is projecting the image of a legitimate businessman, but he suspects that Penguin may also be the ringleader behind an "underground railroad" for supervillains. As the Penguin conducts his affairs, Two-Face enters the club and wants in on his underground railroad project. Penguin tells him to meet him later after hours. Elsewhere, Nightwing and Alfred Pennyworth investigate another nightclub where wagers are placed on hero/villain battle outcomes. Nightwing raids the gambling den and takes down all of the goons. He is surprised however by the hi-tech weaponry that these low level thugs now have access to. At Giovanni's Ristorante, the leaders of two of Gotham's more powerful criminal gangs, the Galantes and the Odessas, meet to discuss territory. Their meeting is interrupted by Tobias Whale who announces his intention of taking control of Gotham's underworld. Later, the Penguin holds a meeting with several of Gotham's most notorious villains, including Hugo Strange, Two-Face, Scarecrow and Mad Hatter. Matches Malone spies on the meeting from behind a darkened alcove. Suddenly, the Suicide Squad bursts into the room and attacks the assemblage of villains. Bane knocks Matches Malone out with a single punch.

It is revealed that Penguin is involved with the Suicide Squad and that he set up the other villains to gain the favor of the Squad. Scarecrow, who has recently reconsidered his decision to abandon his fear toxins, gasses Bronze Tiger and escapes to warn Ventriloquist II. However, when the Ventriloquist and her gang accuse Scarecrow of being Suicide Squad's snitch and then lead an assault on the Iceberg Lounge, Scarecrow leads them into a trap by Tobias Whale. Whale then betrays him, leaving him beaten and tied up, though alive (but barely), as a sign to all "masks" that they are not welcome in Whale's new vision of Gotham. Batman, as Matches Malone, is in Blackgate Penitentiary. Bane, aware that Malone is in fact Batman, arranges for him to be constantly attacked by other inmates to wear him down. Meanwhile, the Riddler investigates Penguin's underground railroad.

Matches Malone ends up being ambushed by Victor Zsasz while sleeping in his cell. Malone manages to defeat Zsasz, but is badly injured in the process. While Penguin tries to negotiate with Tobias Whale, Robin and Oracle try to figure out what is going on in the criminal underground when they are suddenly attacked by Spoiler.

Batman as Matches Malone escapes from the Penitentiary's infirmary and runs into Great White Shark while Scarecrow (still injured) takes revenge on those that have wronged him. Tobias Whale sends a message to Gotham City Police telling them not to interfere.

It is discovered that Johnny Denetto is the one who drove Tobias Whale out of Metropolis and into Gotham City. Bruce/Matches then finds out who is orchestrating his death.

Bruce/Matches learns how Great White Shark got from Arkham Asylum to Blackgate Penitentiary. Tobias Whale and Penguin are both assembling armies. Spoiler is seemingly working with the Penguin to take care of Johnny "Stitches" Denetto of Intergang. Penguin and Spoiler have assembled gangs like the Bat Killers, the Dead End Boys, the Femme Fatales, the Five Points Gang, the L.O.D. and the New Rogues. As Bruce/Matches escapes Blackgate Penitentiary, Nightwing as "Freddie Dinardo" has a run-in with Vigilante. When he gets wounded, Nightwing sees a vision of Leslie Thompkins.

Upon waking up in an infirmary, Nightwing discovers that who he saw as Leslie was actually Riddler. Penguin's gangs and Tobias Whale's 100 are currently fighting each other as Robin, Huntress, Batgirl, and Wildcat get involved. When Riddler visits Penguin, he is thrown into a room where the Femme Fatales are. Even though Penguin gets the upper hand, Tobias Whale reluctantly calls a truce with him in order to stop Johnny "Stitches" Denetto and Intergang. After Vigilante shows up and shoots two members of the Five Points Gang, Batman arrives just in time to save Nightwing from Vigilante.

As Batman continues his fight with Vigilante, Johnny "Stitches" Denetto sends Penguin a package containing Mr. Jessup's cut-up body and glasses. When Penguin has a talk with Johnny, he mentions that Tobias Whale is not on "Penguin's side" anymore. Johnny also mentions that he has threatened the families of those fighting on Penguin's side and tells Penguin that he is giving him a day to get out of town.

When Penguin and Riddler are talking in the Iceberg Lounge, members of Intergang attack. Things were not looking good for the Penguin until Batman arrives and comes to his rescue. However, Batman is not here just to save his life. He lets Penguin know that he owns him now and that he will report everything to Batman concerning Intergang and what is going on in Gotham, to which Penguin was actually quite happy to agree.

Cast of characters
 Batman
 Nightwing
 Robin
 Oracle
 Batgirl
 Spoiler
 Alfred Pennyworth
 Commissioner James Gordon
 Huntress
 Question
 Wildcat
 Penguin
 Riddler
 The Suicide Squad

Villains
 The 100
 Amygdala
 Firefly
 The Galantes
 Gotham Organized Crime
 All-Americans
 Irish Wound Ravens
 Italian East-Siders
 Jewish Sons of David
 Free Men Gang
 Great White Shark
 Hugo Strange
 Intergang
 Johnny "Stitches" Denetto
 Joker
 Killer Moth
 Lock-Up
 Mad Hatter
 Man-Bat
 Mr. Jessup
 The Odessas
 Ra's al Ghul
 Scarecrow
 Tobias Whale
 Two-Face
 Ventriloquist
 Victor Zsasz

Penguin's Army
All members of Penguin's army were provided with weapons based on those of established villains. They formed small groups inspired by the affiliations of the originals. Their individual codenames were not revealed except for a few of them, although the New Rogues' were given their codenames shortly before their deaths in Final Crisis: Rogues' Revenge #2.

 The Bat Killers - A gang that was first seen in Gotham Underground #6. They are based on the Batman villains and have members that are based on Joker, Catman, Mr. Freeze, Mad Hatter, Clayface, and a female version of Bane.
 Miss HGH - A female who is based on Bane.
 The Dead End Boys - A gang that was first seen in Gotham Underground #6. They are based on the Suicide Squad and have members that are based on Chemo, Deadshot, Bolt, Killer Frost, Jewelee, and Shrapnel.
 The Femme Fatales - A female gang that was first seen in Gotham Underground #6. They are based on the female villains and have members that are based on Catwoman, the female Hyena, Magenta, Silver Swan, and a female version of Prankster.
 The Five Points Gang - A gang that was first seen in Gotham Underground #6. They are based on the Fearsome Five and have members that resemble Doctor Light, Jinx, Mammoth, Neutron, and Psimon. The ones based on Jinx and Psimon were killed by Vigilante.
 The L.O.D. - A gang that was first seen in "Gotham Underground" #6. They are based on the Legion of Doom and have members that are based on Lex Luthor (complete with a copy of one of his warsuits), Cheetah, Gorilla Grodd, Metallo, Sonar, and a male version of Giganta.
 The New Rogues - A gang that was first seen in Gotham Underground #3. They are based on the Rogues. The New Rogues were later used by Libra to get the Rogues back when they withdraw from Libra's Secret Society of Super Villains.
 Burn - Based on Heat Wave who uses one of Heat Wave's flame guns. This one was actually Nightwing's "Freddy Dinardo" alias in disguise. Another Burn appeared in Gotham Underground #6 and later joined the New Rogues in attacking the Rogues in Final Crisis.
 Chill - Based on Captain Cold who uses one of Captain Cold's freeze guns.
 Mirror Man - Based on Mirror Master who wields one of Mirror Master's special mirrors. He is not to be confused with the Batman villain of the same name.
 Mr. Magic - Based on Abra Kadabra who wields one of Abra Kadabra's wands.
 Weather Witch - Based on Weather Wizard who wields one of Weather Wizard's weather-controlling wands.

Collected editions
The series has been collected into a trade paperback:

 Gotham Underground (224 pages, Titan Books, January 2009, DC Comics, November 2008)

References

External links
 Delving Into The Gotham Underground With Frank Tieri, Newsarama, September 24, 2007
 Frank Tieri -  Gotham Underground...Deep in The Thick of It, Newsarama, February 13, 2008
 Gotham Underground, IGN
 Review of Gotham Underground #1 , 6 , 7  and 8 , Comics Bulletin
 
 

2007 comics debuts
Gotham City